Bareh Sheykhali (also Romanized as Bareh Sheykh‘alī and Berah Sheykh‘alī) is a village in Boluran Rural District, Darb-e Gonbad District, Kuhdasht County, Lorestan Province, Iran. At the 2006 census, its population was 142, in 26 families.

References 

Towns and villages in Kuhdasht County